The 1992–93 All-Ireland Senior Club Football Championship was the 23rd staging of the All-Ireland Senior Club Football Championship since its establishment by the Gaelic Athletic Association in 1970-71. The championship began on 4 October 1992 and ended on 28 March 1993.

Dr. Crokes entered the championship as the defending champions, however, they were beaten by O'Donovan Rossa in the Munster Club Championship.

On 28 March 1993, O'Donovan Rossa won the championship following a 1-07 to 0-08 defeat of Éire Óg in the All-Ireland final replay at Croke Park. It remains their only championship title.

O'Donovan Rossa's Mick McCarthy was the championship's top scorer with 3-34.

Results

Connacht Senior Club Football Championship

Quarter-final

Semi-finals

Final

Leinster Senior Club Football Championship

First round

Quarter-finals

Semi-finals

Final

Munster Senior Club Football Championship

First round

Semi-finals

Final

Ulster Senior Club Football Championship

Preliminary round

Quarter-finals

Semi-finals

Final

All-Ireland Senior Club Football Championship

Quarter-final

Semi-finals

Final

Championship statistics

Top scorers

Overall

In a single game

Miscellaneous

 Éire Óg won the Leinster Club Championship for the first time in their history. They also became the first club from Carlow to win the title.

References

1992 in Gaelic football
1993 in Gaelic football